Mulgrave is a suburb in Melbourne, Victoria, Australia, 21 km south-east of Melbourne's Central Business District, located within the City of Monash local government area. Mulgrave recorded a population of 19,889 at the 2021 census.

The suburb takes its name from Mulgrave Castle in the English County of North Yorkshire. Sir George Phipps, the Earl of Mulgrave in the Peerage of Great Britain, served as the Governor of Victoria from 1879 to 1884.

The suburb in turn gave its name to the Mulgrave Freeway, which was later renamed to the Monash Freeway.

History

The first settler in Mulgrave parish (a division of the County of Bourke, which covers the Melbourne urban area) was Thomas Napier, in 1839. He was a Scottish builder who first reached the Colony of Victoria in the mid-1830s. Napier settled on the banks of Dandenong Creek and built his homestead in the Bushy Park Wetlands, in what is now Jells Park. None of the original homesteads remain, though some were demolished as late as the latter part of the 20th century. Remains of some homesteads were uncovered during the construction of the EastLink Tollway, temporarily halting work while they were archaeologically examined.

The first Mulgrave Post Office opened on 1 January 1869 but was renamed Wheelers Hill in 1888. In 1904 a second Mulgrave Post Office opened but closed again in 1956. The third Mulgrave Post Office opened in 1967 and closed in 1978. Meanwhile, a Mulgrave North (later Brandon Park) office opened in 1971, and a Mulgrave East (later Waverley Gardens) office opened in 1978.

From Parish to shire
On 19 January 1857 the Oakleigh & Mulgrave Road District (an early form of local government in Victoria) was proclaimed, covering the same area as that covered by the parishes of Oakleigh and Mulgrave. On 1 December 1871, the road district was redesignated as a shire and renamed Shire of Oakleigh. On 13 March 1891, the Borough of Oakleigh was created by excising part of Oakleigh Shire, and in 1897 Oakleigh Shire was renamed as Mulgrave Shire.

Reduction of size
Throughout its history, Mulgrave has been plagued by the shifting of its borders and the reduction of its total size. Its borders remained relatively unchanged until 1949 when land was transferred from Mulgrave Shire to Oakleigh City. As a part of the changes, offices for the Shire were opened in present-day Notting Hill.

The end of Mulgrave Shire as a name occurred in April 1961, when it was proclaimed a city but renamed as Waverley. The name nonetheless continues in use as the name of the suburb and of the parish.

Present day

Mulgrave is one of the few Melbourne suburbs split into two distinct areas, with each sharing the common name but not prefixing it with 'East' or 'West'. This came about as a result of the renaming of parts of Mulgrave to Wheelers Hill, Victoria in the late 1990s. So separated by distance are the two parts that a group local residents from the South Eastern area campaigned, albeit unsuccessfully, in 2004 to have the area renamed to Waverley Park, Victoria.

Mulgrave is now best known for Jacksons Road, which runs through the eastern part of the suburb. Jacksons Road is familiar to many Melburnians due to the Jacksons Road Interchange with the Monash Freeway. The Jacksons Road Interchange is a VicRoads timing point for traffic travelling to/from the city. Jacksons Road is a common point of reference for radio news traffic reports when broadcasting travel times into/from the city travelling on the Monash Freeway. Other major points of interest in Mulgrave are the Waverley Gardens Shopping Centre, the Village Green Hotel on the south-west corner of Springvale and Ferntree Gully Roads, the Sunday Mulgrave Farmers' Market on the corner of Jacksons and Wellington Roads, and the former Waverley Park AFL/VFL football ground, now a redeveloped housing estate.

Transport

Metropolitan buses run through this area as well as two popular SmartBus routes and the original hourly services. Most of these bus routes are run by Grenda's Bus Services, now Ventura Bus Lines.

Sport

The suburb has multiple Australian Rules football teams, The Mulgrave Lions, competing in the local Eastern Football League and the Mazenod Old Collegians FC competing in the Victorian Amateur Football Association.

There is also a Mulgrave Cricket Club and a Mulgrave Junior Cricket Club as well as the Mazenod Cricket Club which both compete in the Eastern Cricket Association.  Mulgrave Cricket Club also competes in the southern churches and district association.

The Mulgrave Lions and the Mulgrave Cricket Club share Mulgrave Reserve, off Garnett Road, as their home ground. There is also the St Pauls Cricket Club and the Wellington Tennis Club at Southern Reserve on Police Road, as well as the Mulgrave Country Club Cricket club located at Wellington Reserve.

 Mazenod College is located in Mulgrave, and offers a number of sporting clubs through its Old Collegians' Association, which is open to members of the community as well as current and former students.

Education
 Mazenod Secondary College
 Wellington Secondary College
 Albany Rise Primary School
 Mulgrave Primary School  Established 1879
 St John Vianney's Primary School

Notable residents
 Daniel Andrews, the 48th and current premier of Victoria

See also
 City of Waverley – Mulgrave was previously within this former local government area.

References

Suburbs of Melbourne
Suburbs of the City of Monash